Andrew Babington (born 22 July 1963) is a former English cricketer. He played for Sussex between 1986 and 1990 and for Gloucestershire between 1991 and 1994.

References

External links

1963 births
Living people
English cricketers
Gloucestershire cricketers
Sussex cricketers
People from Marylebone
Cricketers from Greater London